The  occurred in Tottori prefecture, Japan at 17:36 local time on September 10, 1943. Although the earthquake occurred during World War II, information about the disaster was not censored, and relief volunteers and supplies came from many parts of the Empire of Japan, including Manchukuo.

The Tottori earthquake had its epicenter offshore from Ketaka District, now part of Tottori, and registered a magnitude of 7.0 on the moment magnitude scale. The seismic intensity was recorded as 6 in Tottori city, and 5 as far away as Okayama on the Inland Sea. The center of Tottori city, with many antiquated buildings was the hardest hit, with an estimated 80% of its structures damaged or destroyed. As the earthquake struck in the evening when most kitchens had fires lit in preparation for the evening meal, fires broke out in 16 locations around the city. With water mains damaged, citizens formed bucket brigades to prevent fires from spreading. The number of fatalities was 1,083, including numerous Zainichi Koreans working in the nearby Aragane Copper Mines.

Two magnitude 6.2 earthquakes had occurred in the same area earlier that year on March 4 and 5, but did not cause significant damage.

See also
 List of earthquakes in 1943
 List of earthquakes in Japan

Notes

External links

Tottori
Tottori
September 1943 events
Earthquakes in the Empire of Japan
History of Tottori Prefecture
Earthquakes of the Showa period
1943 disasters in Japan